Eulalio García Pereda (born 11 May 1951) is a former Spanish cyclist.

Major results

1975
 1st Overall Vuelta a Navarra
1976
 1st Stage 1 Vuelta a Cantabria
 2nd GP Vizcaya
 3rd Klasika Primavera
1977
 1st Stages 1 & 3 Vuelta a La Rioja
 3rd Overall GP Leganes
1st Stage 1
1978
 1st Prologue & Stage 1A Vuelta a La Rioja
 1st Prologue & Stage 4B Vuelta a Cantabria
 2nd Overall GP Leganes
1st Stages 2 & 3
 2nd Trofeo Elola
 4th Overall Vuelta a España
1979
 1st Overall Vuelta a La Rioja
 3rd Overall Volta a la Comunitat Valenciana
1980
 1st Stage 8 Vuelta a España
 1st Overall Vuelta a Cantabria
1st Stage 1a
 2nd GP Navarre
 3rd Overall Vuelta a La Rioja
1st Stage 3
 3rd Overall Vuelta a Andalucía
1981
 1st  National Road Race Championships
 1st Campeonato de España de Fondo
 2nd Clásica de Sabiñánigo
 2nd Overall Vuelta a Cantabria
 2nd Overall Vuelta a Burgos
1st Stage 5
 2nd Klasika Primavera
 2nd GP Pascuas
1982
 2nd National Road Race Championships
 2nd GP Pascuas
 2nd Klasika Primavera
 3rd Overall Vuelta a La Rioja
1983
 1st Stage 1 Vuelta a La Rioja
1984
 2nd GP Llodio

References

1951 births
Living people
Spanish male cyclists
Spanish Vuelta a España stage winners
Sportspeople from the Province of Ávila
Cyclists from Castile and León